"Early in the Morning and Late at Night" is a song written by Troy Seals and Frank J. Myers, and recorded by American country music artist Hank Williams Jr.  It was released in November 1988 as the second single from the album Wild Streak.  The song reached #14 on the Billboard Hot Country Singles & Tracks chart.

Chart performance

References

1989 singles
Hank Williams Jr. songs
Songs written by Frank J. Myers
Songs written by Troy Seals
Song recordings produced by Barry Beckett
Song recordings produced by Jim Ed Norman
Warner Records singles
Curb Records singles
1988 songs